Kanjikuzhy  is a village in Idukki district in the Indian state of Kerala.

Demographics
As of the 2001 Census of India, Kanjikuzhi had a population of 28,504 with 14,426 males and 14,078 females.

References

Villages in Idukki district